Francis Arthur Bainbridge FRS FRCP (29 July 1874 – 27 October 1921) was an English physiologist.

History
Bainbridge was born in Stockton-on-Tees, County Durham, in 1874 and educated at The Leys School. He entered Trinity College, Cambridge, in 1893, graduating BA in 1896, earning an M.B. in 1901, and finally a doctorate in 1904. Medicine did not appeal to him, and for a while he focused on Pathology and Bacteriology. In 1905, he became a lecturer of Pathology at Guy's Hospital, and in 1907, he went on as assistant Bacteriologist to the Lister Institute of Preventive Medicine. His work on food-poisoning bacilli gained wide recognition, and was embodied in his lectures at the Royal College of Physicians. In 1911 he became a professor of physiology at Durham University. In 1915 he attained the chair of physiology at St. Bartholomew's Hospital, where he remained for the rest of his life.

Bainbridge is best remembered for showing that an increase in pressure on the venous side of the heart resulted in an increased heart rate due to denervation of vagal influences to the heart. The eponymous "Bainbridge reflex" is named after him, being explained as an increased heart rate due to an increase of right atrial pressure. Bainbridge's findings contradicted "Marey's Law", a law that stated that an increase in blood pressure caused a lowering of the heart rate. Marey's Law was devised in 1861 by French physiologist Étienne-Jules Marey (1830–1904).

Bainbridge also made important contributions in his studies of the mechanism of lymph formation, as well as on filtration properties of the glomeruli in the kidneys. His most popular publications were "Essentials of Physiology" (1914) and "Physiology of Muscular Exercise" (1919).

He was elected a Fellow of the Royal Society in May 1919

References

 Francis Arthur Bainbridge @ Who Named It

1874 births
1921 deaths
Academics of Durham University
English physiologists
Fellows of the Royal Society
People educated at The Leys School
Alumni of Trinity College, Cambridge